The Defense Criminal Investigative Service is the criminal investigative arm of the Office of Inspector General, U.S. Department of Defense. DCIS protects military personnel by investigating cases of fraud, bribery, and corruption; preventing the illegal transfer of sensitive defense technologies to proscribed nations and criminal elements; investigating companies that use defective, substandard, or counterfeit parts in weapon systems and equipment utilized by the military; and stopping cyber crimes and computer intrusions.

Background
On April 20, 1981, Secretary of Defense Caspar Weinberger established DCIS as a worldwide civilian Federal law enforcement agency that  investigates suspected criminal activities involving DoD Components and DoD contractors.  When DCIS was created, the criminal investigative functions previously assigned to the Defense Investigative Service were transferred, along with 100 personnel billets, to the Office of the Assistant to the Secretary of Defense (Review and Oversight). In October 1981, an initial cadre of 12 individuals of the DIS Special Investigations Unit began operating as DCIS special agents under the direction, authority, and control of the Assistant to the Secretary of Defense (Review and Oversight).  DCIS was incorporated within the Department of Defense's Office of Inspector General when it was established in 1982.

In 1997, DCIS became one of the first OIG investigative components to be granted permanent statutory law enforcement authorities comparable to the those possessed by the FBI.  Upon passage of Public Law 105–85 (see Div. A, title X, § 1071(a)), DCIS special agents were granted the ability to carry concealed firearms, make arrests with or without a warrant, and execute search warrants.

Responsibilities
It is the obligation of the DoD Inspector General to "initiate, conduct, and supervise such...investigations in the Department of Defense (including the military departments) as the Inspector General considers appropriate" (IG Act Sec. 8(c)(2)) and to "provide leadership and coordination and recommend policies for activities...to prevent and detect fraud and abuse in...[DoD] programs and operations (IG Act Sec. 2(2))."

Priorities

DCIS' current investigative priorities include:

Significant fraud and corruption impacting crucial DoD operations, with particular emphasis upon schemes impacting the health, safety, welfare, or mission‐readiness of U.S. troops.

Significant procurement and acquisition fraud and other financial crimes which result in multi‐million dollars losses, thus depriving DoD of critically‐needed funds that would otherwise be utilized to finance vital national defense initiatives.

Defective, substituted, counterfeit, or substandard products introduced into the DoD acquisition system, with particular emphasis upon allegations involving troop safety and/or mission‐readiness.

Illegal theft, export, diversion, transfer, or proliferation of sensitive DoD technology, systems, weapons, and equipment, with particular emphasis upon allegations involving targeted foreign nations, organized international criminal organizations, or potentially hostile entities apt to utilize said items in furtherance of assaults against U.S. military forces.

Health care fraud committed by providers that involves (a) quality of care, unnecessary care, or failure to provide care to Tricare‐eligible service members, retirees, dependents, or survivors; or (b) significant direct loss to DoD's Tricare Management Activity.

Computer intrusions and other cyber crimes that result in (a) serious compromises of the Global Information Grid; (b) exfiltration of sensitive DoD data or large volumes of personally identifiable information pertaining to civilian DoD employees or service members; or (c) potential contractual violations on the part of a DoD contractor.

Organization
DCIS is led by the Deputy Inspector General for Investigations.  The Deputy Inspector General for Investigations is cross-designated as the Director of DCIS.  The Principal Deputy Director of DCIS reports directly to the Director and serves as the organization's second-in-command.

DCIS Headquarters is organized into two functional branches: 
 Investigative Operations
 Internal Operations
Each branch is managed by an Assistant Inspector General who is cross-designated as a Deputy Director of DCIS.

Locations
DCIS is headquartered in Alexandria, Virginia, and maintains a presence in over 50 separate domestic and international locales.
Field offices are situated in the following locations:
 Mid-Atlantic Field Office, Alexandria, Virginia
 Northeast Field Office, Boston, Massachusetts
 Southeast Field Office, Atlanta, Georgia
 Southwest Field Office, Dallas, Texas
 Western Field Office, Mission Viejo, California
 Cyber Field Office, Alexandria, Virginia
 Transnational Operations Field Office, Alexandria, Virginia

Each field office is overseen by a Special Agent-in-Charge who is responsible for overseeing multiple subordinate resident agencies and posts of duties located throughout the United States.

At present, DCIS maintains a presence in the following international locations:
Camp Arifjan, Kuwait
Naval Support Activity Bahrain, Bahrain
Clay Kaserne, Wiesbaden, Germany
Al Udeid Air Base, Qatar
Camp Humphreys, Pyeongtaek, South Korea

Special agents
Pursuant to Title 10 of the United States Code §1585, DCIS special agents conducting, supervising, or coordinating investigations of criminal activity in programs and operations of the Department of Defense have the authority to execute and serve any warrant or other process issued under the authority of the United States; to make arrests without a warrant for any offense against the United States committed in the presence of that agent; and to make arrests without a warrant for any felony cognizable under the laws of the United States if the agent has probable cause to believe that the person to be arrested has committed or is committing the felony.

Authorization for special agents of the Defense Criminal Investigative Service to carry firearms while assigned investigative duties or other duties as the Secretary may prescribe can be found in 10 U.S. Code §1585(a).

Selection and training

To be considered for a DCIS special agent position, an individual must: Be a U.S. citizen, age between 21 and 37 years, pass screening, background investigation and have exceptional communication skills.

DCIS special agent candidates initially receive training at the U.S. Department of Homeland Security’s Federal Law Enforcement Training Center (FLETC) located in Glynco, Georgia. They attend FLETC's basic training course for special agents, the Criminal Investigator Training Program, which lasts about 12 weeks and represents the beginning of basic training received by DCIS special agents. Later, agents may return to FLETC to attend specialized training in contractor fraud, money laundering, computer crimes, advanced interview techniques, etc.

In popular culture
 In The A-Team film of 2010, the character Charissa Sosa is captain of the DCIS.
 In NCIS Season 20 Episode 6, the DCIS look for a mole inside NCIS, making Kasie Hines a Head Investigator for the DCIS.

See also 
 Department of the Air Force Office of Special Investigations
 Department of Defense Whistleblower Program
 Law enforcement agency
 Naval Criminal Investigative Service
 United States Army Counterintelligence
 United States Army Criminal Investigation Command
 United States Department of Defense
 United States Marine Corps Criminal Investigation Division

References

External links

Criminal Investigative Service
Military police agencies of the United States
Government agencies established in 1981
1981 establishments in the United States